Whispering Footsteps is a 1943 American film noir crime film directed by Howard Bretherton and starring John Hubbard, Rita Quigley, and Joan Blair.

Premise
A bank clerk's life becomes a nightmare because he fits the description of a maniac killer.

Cast
 John Hubbard as Marcus Aurelius 'Mark' Borne
 Rita Quigley as Brook Hammond
 Joan Blair as Helene LaSalle
 Charles Halton as Harry Hammond
 Cy Kendall as Detective Brad Dolan
 Juanita Quigley as Rose Murphy
 Mary Gordon as Ma Murphy
 William Benedict as Jerry Murphy
 Matt McHugh as Cy Walsh, boarder
 Marie Blake as Sally Lukens, boarder

Reception
TV Guide wrote of the film, "A compelling crime thriller which keeps one guessing until the end."

References

External links
 
 
 
 

1943 films
1943 crime drama films
1940s serial killer films
American crime thriller films
American black-and-white films
Film noir
Republic Pictures films
American crime drama films
1940s English-language films
1940s American films